Upa-Sangharaj Satya Priya Mahathero (House name- Bidhu Bhiushan Barua, born, 10 June 1930 –Died, 4 October 2019~ Ramu Upazilla, Cox's Bazar, Bangladesh. ) was a Bangladeshi Buddhist pundit, writer , religious leader and social worker. He is mostly known for received the highest honourable national prize of Bangladesh "EKUSHEY PADAK". He was the President of Bangladesh Sangharaj Bhikkhu Mahasava. He was the first translator & writer of 'The Chullyabarga' which is an important part of highest religious book of Buddhist called "TRIPITHAK".

Biography
Satya Priya Mahathero was born on 10 June 1930 in South Merongloa Village of Fatekharpul Union which is situated in Ramu Upazila of Cox's Bazar District. His father was Harakumar Barua and his mother was Premamayi Barua.

Mahathero received pravrajya in February 1950 from Binayacharya Aryabangsha Mahathero and dedicated himself to human beings. Six months later he became a bhikkhu on Maghi Purnima. He received Ekushey Padak in 2015 for social service.

Mahathero died on 4 October 2019 at the age of 89 at Bangabandhu Sheikh Mujib Medical University Hospital, Dhaka.

References

1930 births
2019 deaths
People from Cox's Bazar District
Recipients of the Ekushey Padak
Bangladeshi Buddhist monks